Monomoy Shoals is a set of shoals (shallow, sandy ocean bottom) off Monomoy Point (which is in Chatham, Massachusetts on Cape Cod).  It lies in the Atlantic Ocean just outside Nantucket Sound.

Constituent named shoals include:

 Bearse Shoal
 Handkerchief Shoal
 Little Round Shoal
 Stonehorse Shoal

References

Shoals of the United States
Landforms of Barnstable County, Massachusetts